Committee on Taxation (SkU) is a parliamentary committee in the Swedish Riksdag. The committee manages and debates matters concerning state and municipal taxes and matters concerning taxation, tax payment, and, population registration, as well as matters concerning the enforcement system. Taxes also include customs duties and taxes comparable to taxes.

The committee's Speaker is Niklas Karlsson from the Social Democratic Party and the committee's vice-Speaker is Per Söderlund from the Sweden Democrats.

List of speakers for the committee

List of vice-speakers for the committee

References

External links
Skatteutskottet/Tax Committee riksdagen.se
(In English) committees in the Riksdag. riksdagen.se/en/

Committees of the Riksdag